Wim Sweldens is a Belgian American business leader, scientist, and inventor notable for innovations in communications and signal processing technology. Sweldens is the inventor of the wavelet lifting scheme, an algorithm used both in the JPEG 2000 image compression standard, as well as for compressing 3D images into billions of tiny triangular modules. At telecommunications firm Alcatel-Lucent in New Jersey, he led development of new cell tower technology called lightRadio which reduces the size of transmission equipment dramatically. The equipment uses only basic electrical power and can be placed indoors and linked to optical fiber cables; it enables mobile networks to operate with much less electricity, halving CO2 emissions and reducing the carbon footprint, and permitting cell phone service to reach more people over expanded geographic areas.

In 2013 Sweldens co-founded Kiswe Mobile with Jeong Kim and Jimmy Lynn with a vision to bring interactivity, personalization, and social participation to live streamed sports and entertainment events. The Kiswe interactive streaming (also called reverse streaming) technology has powered some of the biggest music and sports events in the world, notably with the K-pop band BTS with over one million live viewers.

Kiswe's multi view technology allows end users to live choose their favorite camera angle of an event. Users can also remote participate in an event through chat, cheering, and uploading selfie videos. Sweldens was one of the key people behind Kiswe's virtual Tour of Flanders during the 2020 Covid-19 lockdown.

Sweldens holds 28 US patents and has received prestigious awards, including the MIT TR35 in 1999 and the Leslie Fox Prize for Numerical Analysis. He is an Honorary Professor at the University of Leuven.

References

External links
 Wim Sweldens at lightRadio press conference (see 3:00+ minutes)
 Research website

Living people
Computer scientists
American telecommunications industry businesspeople
Fellow Members of the IEEE
Year of birth missing (living people)